
Brigham is a small village in the East Riding of Yorkshire, England. The village forms part of the civil parish of Foston on the Wolds.

Driffield Navigation
The Driffield Navigation canal passes at the west of the village. The Brigham section of the Driffield Navigation was dug about 1767. A swing bridge was built across the canal to allow access to Elm Tree Farm, and a footpath to Corpslanding and Hutton Cranswick. In 1967, after a decline in canal traffic, the swing bridge was kept closed, and was replaced by a fixed bridge in the 1970s. In 2003 a new working swing bridge was installed.

Brigham position on the Driffield Navigation

Next location upstream - Snakeholme Lock
Next location downstream - Fisholme
A village sailing club was established in 1928.

References

External links

Villages in the East Riding of Yorkshire